Marion Elizabeth Tylee (25  May 1900 – 27 February 1981) was a New Zealand artist.

Private life
Born at Makuri near Pahiatua, New Zealand, she was the daughter of Walter Edward Charles Tylee and his wife Katherine Anne née Perry. After the Second World War she settled in Palmerston North, New Zealand.

Career 
Tylee studied in New Zealand with D. K. Richmond and T. A. McCormack. In 1923, she won a New Zealand Academy of Fine Arts award for a watercolour. From 1926 to 1929 she attended the Slade School of Fine Art in London<ref>Social News page 15, The New Zealand Herald, 15 August 1929</ref> and in 1937 at Académie Colarossi in Paris.

She worked primarily in linocuts, watercolour, and oils. Works by Tylee are held at the Museum of New Zealand Te Papa Tongarewa including: Crimson plums (1953); Village in the hills (c. 1930); Mount Tarawera, New Zealand (1935); and Rooftops'' (c. 1928).

After moving to Palmerston North she played a major role in the development of the Manawatu Art Gallery (now part of the Te Manawa Museum of Art, Science and History).

Exhibitions 
Tylee exhibited with the:    
 Auckland Society of Arts
 Canterbury Society of Arts
 New Zealand Academy of Fine Arts
 Rutland Group
 The Group (1934)

References

Further reading  
Artist files for Marion Tylee are held at:
 E. H. McCormick Research Library, Auckland Art Gallery Toi o Tāmaki
 Hocken Collections Uare Taoka o Hākena
 Te Aka Matua Research Library, Museum of New Zealand Te Papa Tongarewa
Also see:
 Concise Dictionary of New Zealand Artists McGahey, Kate (2000) Gilt Edge

1900 births
1969 deaths
New Zealand painters
New Zealand women painters
People from Palmerston North
Alumni of the Slade School of Fine Art
Académie Colarossi alumni
People from Carterton, New Zealand
People associated with the Museum of New Zealand Te Papa Tongarewa
People associated with the Rutland Group
People associated with the Canterbury Society of Arts
People associated with the Auckland Society of Arts
People associated with The Group (New Zealand art)